The Chillicothe Junto was a term applied to a group of Chillicothe, Ohio Democratic-Republican politicians who brought about the admission of Ohio as a state (1803) and largely controlled its politics for some years thereafter. The best known were Thomas Worthington, Edward Tiffin and Nathaniel Massie.

References

Dictionary of American History by James Truslow Adams, New York: Charles Scribner's Sons, 1940

History of Ohio
Politicians from Chillicothe, Ohio